Sami El-Sayed (born 21 October 1940) is an Egyptian water polo player. He competed in the men's tournament at the 1964 Summer Olympics.

References

1940 births
Living people
Egyptian male water polo players
Olympic water polo players of Egypt
Water polo players at the 1964 Summer Olympics
Place of birth missing (living people)
20th-century Egyptian people